Pixies at the BBC is a compilation of BBC radio sessions by the American alternative rock band Pixies. Released by 4AD on July 6, 1998 in the United Kingdom and by Elektra Records on July 14, 1998 in the United States—five years after the band's initial split—it was recorded over several sessions between 1988 and 1991 at the BBC. The album is characterized by its raw, under-produced sound.

Track listing
All songs were written by Black Francis except tracks 1 and 15. The final track, "(In Heaven) Lady in the Radiator Song" was written by Peter Ivers and David Lynch for Eraserhead.

"Wild Honey Pie" (John Lennon, Paul McCartney) – 1:52
"There Goes My Gun" – 1:25
"Dead" – 1:30
"Subbacultcha" – 2:08
"Manta Ray" – 2:15
"Is She Weird" – 2:52
"Ana" – 2:14
"Down to the Well" – 2:31
"Wave of Mutilation (UK Surf)" – 2:22
"Letter to Memphis" – 2:33
"Levitate Me" – 2:18
"Caribou" – 3:18
"Monkey Gone to Heaven" – 2:57
"Hey" – 3:17
"In Heaven (Lady in the Radiator Song)" (Peter Ivers, David Lynch) – 1:51

Recording and transmission dates
Tracks 1, 11, 12, 14 & 15 - Recorded for the John Peel show, May 3, 1988, first transmitted May 16, 1988.
Tracks 2, 3, & 5 - Recorded for the John Peel show, October 9, 1988, first transmitted October 18, 1988.
Tracks 4 & 10 - Recorded for the John Peel show, June 23, 1991, first transmitted August 4, 1991.
Track 6 - Recorded for the John Peel show, June 11, 1990, first transmitted August 10, 1990.
Tracks 7 & 13 - Recorded for the Mark Goodier show, August 18, 1990, first transmitted August 20, 1990.
Tracks 8 & 9 - Recorded for the John Peel show, April 16, 1989, first transmitted May 2, 1989.

References

External links

Pixies at the BBC at Last.fm
Pixies at the BBC at Google Music

BBC Radio recordings
Peel Sessions recordings
Pixies (band) compilation albums
Pixies (band) live albums
1998 live albums
1998 compilation albums
4AD compilation albums
4AD live albums
Elektra Records live albums
Elektra Records compilation albums